For information about professional golf see:
Professional golfer, which describes the various branches of the profession.
Professional golf tours, which covers elite professional competitive golf and links to more detailed articles about each tour.
Most of the subcategories of :Category:Golf tournaments contain articles about professional golf tournaments.
Most of the articles in :Category:golfers are about professionals.

Golf terminology